The Democratic Programme was a declaration of economic and social principles adopted by the First Dáil at its first meeting on 21 January 1919. A text of the programme was first adopted in Irish and then in English. Its official Irish title was Clár Oibre Poblacánaighe.

On the national issue, the Sinn Féin Manifesto for the 1918 election had stressed the long history of Irish resistance to British rule "based on our unbroken tradition of nationhood, on a unity in a national name which has never been challenged, on our possession of a distinctive national culture and social order, on the moral courage and dignity of our people in the face of alien aggression...." The party was committed to use "any and every means available to render impotent the power of England to hold Ireland in subjection by military force or otherwise." The stance was not inclusive of those who supported or tolerated the link with Britain, and 'alien aggression' became synonymous with occupation of the island of Ireland, whether by the British forces or by the descendants of the British settlers from earlier centuries. 

On the social front, the Manifesto linked the nationalist aim of freedom with the opportunity for equality, "reasserting the inalienable right of the Irish Nation to sovereign independence, reaffirming the determination of the Irish people to achieve it, and guaranteeing within the independent Nation equal rights and equal opportunities to all its citizens."

On winning 73 seats, the Dáil voted at its first session for the Democratic Programme, as embodying these ideals and also the Declaration of Independence.

The Democratic Program was drafted with the assistance of Thomas Johnson, the leader of the Labour Party, in return for the Labour Party not campaigning in the 1918 election and continuing moral support.

The Programme's Vision
The Programme was published and approved by the First Dáil on the same day as the declaration of the Irish Republic, and by chance the same day as the outbreak of the Irish War of Independence . The programme outlined a socialist policy which included: the public ownership of the means of production, natural resources and "wealth"; state provision of education for children and care for the elderly; ensuring that children receive food; promotion of industrial development as well as the exploitation of natural resources. The Labour Party inserted a clause that private property was to be subordinate "to the public right and welfare." 

The First Dáil subsequently issued "decrees" on many matters, but none of these were based on the Programme. There was no money to put the plans into effect. The war launched by Sinn Féin led to "British sanctions in the form of withdrawal of grants... inhibiting financial autonomy. The Minister for Finance, Michael Collins, found it impossible to introduce a system of income tax and the Dáil itself never advocated that the Irish should stop paying tax or indeed land annuities to the British." Of amounts raised abroad, by far the greatest share went to "world propaganda", and not towards social issues, according to the May 1921 Dáil statement.

The debate on its practicality
Brian Farrell felt that the Democratic Programme "did not represent the social and economic ideals of the first Dáil. Most of its members had not read the document in advance; the few who had seen it in draft form were reluctant enough to subscribe to it and there was a last minute redrafting ... only hours before the Dáil met."

Father Michael O'Kennedy, prominent in the rise of Sinn Féin from 1917, later said of the social and redistributive aspects that "It is a pity to mix up Sinn Féin in that land question. Of necessity questions of land, food and industries turn up, but all are of secondary importance and none must obscure our objective."

It is still arguable whether the programme was a cynical and unworkable attempt to secure on-going support from the poorer part of the population, or a genuine plan that was shelved but which should be put into effect unaltered in today's very different Ireland. Unionists in Northern Ireland will say that its impractical financial nature confirms why their political forebears could not consider unity with the nationalist part of Ireland. Socialists argue that its implementation is long overdue.

References

External links

History of the Republic of Ireland